Guy Sumner Lowman (May 1877 – September 14, 1943) was an American football, basketball, and baseball coach and a player of baseball. He served as the head football coach at Warrensburg Teachers College—now the University of Central Missouri (1907), the University of Alabama (1910), Kansas State University (1911–1914), and the University of Wisconsin–Madison (1918). Lowman also coached basketball at Warrensburg Teachers College, now known as the University of Central Missouri (1907–1908), the University of Missouri, (1908–1910), Kansas State (1911–1914), Indiana University (1916), and Wisconsin (1917–1920) and baseball at Central Missouri State (1907–1908), Missouri (1909–1910), Alabama (1911), Kansas State (1912–1915), and Wisconsin (1918, 1921–1932).

Playing career
Lowman graduated from Springfield College in 1905, where he lettered in baseball.

Coaching career
Following graduation, he began his career at Warrensburg Teachers College, coaching football, basketball, and baseball from 1907 to 1908. Subsequently, from 1908 to 1910, he coached baseball and basketball at the University of Missouri, posting a 19–15 record in basketball and 20–11–1 record in baseball. In 1910, he moved to the University of Alabama, where he coached the football team for one season, recording a 4–4 mark.

Leaving Alabama after one season, he moved to Kansas State University, where he coached football (four seasons), basketball (three seasons), and baseball (four seasons) between 1911 and 1915. His basketball teams posted winning records each year he coached them. His best football season at Kansas State was 1912, when his squad posted an 8–2 record and won the Kansas Collegiate Athletic Conference title. He was fired after his 1914 football team recorded a 1–5–1 mark.

In 1916, Lowman moved to Indiana University, where he coached the basketball squad to a 13–6 record. From 1917 to 1920, he coached baseball and basketball at the University of Wisconsin–Madison. He also coached the Wisconsin football team for the 1918 season, posting a 3–3 mark. His 1917–18 basketball team posted a 14–3 record and won the Big Ten Conference title.

Later life, death and honors
After his coaching career ended, Lowman remained at the University of Wisconsin–Madison as a professor, and served as chairman of the Physical Education Department there. He died on September 14, 1943 at the age of 66 after a long illness. The baseball field at Wisconsin was named in his honor.

Head coaching record

Football

References

1877 births
1943 deaths
Alabama Crimson Tide athletic directors
Alabama Crimson Tide baseball coaches
Alabama Crimson Tide football coaches
Baseball players from Iowa
Basketball coaches from Iowa
Central Missouri Mules and Jennies athletic directors
Central Missouri Mules baseball coaches
Central Missouri Mules basketball coaches
Central Missouri Mules football coaches
Kansas State Wildcats baseball coaches
Kansas State Wildcats football coaches
Kansas State Wildcats men's basketball coaches
Indiana Hoosiers men's basketball coaches
Missouri Tigers football coaches
Missouri Tigers baseball coaches
Missouri Tigers men's basketball coaches
Wisconsin Badgers baseball coaches
Wisconsin Badgers football coaches
Wisconsin Badgers men's basketball coaches
Springfield Pride baseball players
University of Wisconsin–Madison faculty
People from Cass County, Iowa